Rahgeer  is a Bollywood film. It was released in 1943. The film starred Trilok Kapoor, Shantarin, Masood, Yakub, Zohra Sehgal and Shahzadi. The music director was Khan Mastana and the lyricist was Shewan Rizvi.

Cast
Trilok Kapoor
Shantarin,
Yakub
Zohra Sehgal  
Shahzadi 
Anwaribai 
Habib

Soundtrack
The music for the film was composed by Khan Mastana and lyrics written by Shewan Rizwi. The songs were sung by Khan Mastana, Zohrabai Ambalewali, Amirbai Karnataki, Faizbai and Ayaz.

Songs
"Rahgeer Sambhal Kar Chalna" sung by Khan Mastana
"Kahan Se Aaya Kahan Hai Jaana" 
"Jaa Bhanwre Jaa"
"Aaja Saaki Aaja" by Khan Mastana
"Ae Zindagi Hansa De" by Zohrabai, Ayaz
"Dekho Badal Na Jaana"
"Ameeri Lee Toh Aisi" by Faizbai, Khan Mastana
"Apni Toh Zamane Se" by Amirbai Karnataki
"Thodi Si Khushi Humne Paayi Thi"

References

External links
 

1943 films
1940s Hindi-language films
Films scored by Khan Mastana
Indian black-and-white films
Indian comedy-drama films
1943 comedy-drama films